Idriss may refer to:

 Idriss Arnaoud Ali (born 1945), President of the National Assembly of Djibouti
 Idriss Carlos Kameni (born 1984), Cameroonian football player
 Idriss Déby (1952–2021), President of Chad
 Idriss Ndele Moussa, Chadian politician
 Mahamat Idriss, Chadian high jumper
 Idriss (terrorist), alleged Canadian militant with ties to al-Qaeda
 Ramey Idriss (1911–1971), American musician and songwriter

See also
 Idris (disambiguation)

Given names
Surnames